Keva Bethel, CMG (18 August 1935 – 15 February 2011) was a Bahamian educator and the first president of the College of the Bahamas. In 1995, she was honoured as a companion in the Order of St Michael and St George.

Early life
Keva Marie Eldon was born on 18 August 1935 in Saint Matthews Parish, on New Providence, in The Bahamas, which at the time was a crown colony of the British Empire, to Rowena (née Hill) and Sidney Eldon. She attended Queen's College in Nassau, graduating in 1950. Following her only sibling, Michael Eldon abroad, Eldon went to England in 1954. She enrolled in Kirby Lodge School in Little Shelford in preparation for the Cambridge examinations. After two years of study, she entered Girton College, Cambridge studying languages, with a specialization in French and Spanish, graduating in 1959.

Career
Returning to Nassau that same year, she began teaching at the Government High School (GHS). In 1962, she married E. Clement Bethel and over the next three years, the couple had two children, Nicolette and Edward, while she completed her master's degree in 1963. In 1966, she was appointed Deputy headmistress of GHS and began involvement in the planning phases for the establishment of the College of the Bahamas. In 1975, when the College was launched, she transferred there as the first Chair of the Humanities Department. Later she served as academic dean, and vice-principal. In 1981, she completed her PhD at the University of Alberta and the following year was appointed as Principal of the College of the Bahamas, leading the organization for the next sixteen years. During her tenure, she worked to change the curricula from offering Associate degrees to a fully accredited Bachelor's degree institution and pressed for the reorganization into a university. When the College was reorganized in 1995, she became the inaugural president and that same year was honored as a companion in the Order of St Michael and St George. She served as president through 1998, when she retired.

After her retirement, Bethel began writing a book chronicling the history of education in the Bahamas, which she had not completed at the time of her death. During this time, she also served on the National Advisory Council in Education and Government Student Loan Programme.

Death and legacy
Bethel died from ovarian cancer on 15 February 2011 in Nassau, eight days after her brother's death. She is remembered for her contributions to development of education and the University of the Bahamas.

References

Citations

Bibliography

1935 births
2011 deaths
People from Nassau, Bahamas
Alumni of Girton College, Cambridge
Bahamian educators
Companions of the Order of St Michael and St George
University of Alberta alumni
Women school principals and headteachers